Anders Gustaf Ekeberg (Stockholm, Sweden, 16 January 1767 – Uppsala, Sweden, 11 February 1813) was a Swedish analytical chemist who discovered tantalum in 1802.
He was notably deaf.

Education
Anders Gustav Ekeberg was a Swedish scientist, mathematician and expert in Greek literature. 
His father, Joseph Erik Ekeberg, was a shipbuilder.  His uncle was Carl Gustaf Ekeberg.

Anders Gustav Ekeberg attended school at Kalmar, Söderåkra, Vestervik, and Karlskrona. 
He was a gifted student and enrolled at Uppsala University in 1784, graduating in 1788.  His thesis addressed the extraction of oils from seeds.  In 1789 and 1790, he traveled and studied in Germany, hearing Martin Heinrich Klaproth lecture in Berlin as well as Christian Ehrenfried Weigel in Greifswald.

Career
In 1794, Anders Gustav Ekeberg began teaching at Uppsala. He was a supporter of Antoine Lavoisier's proposals for systematizing chemical nomenclature. In 1795 he and Pehr von Afzelius published the first article to introduce the modern names for chemical elements such as hydrogen, nitrogen, and oxygen into the Swedish language, "On the Present State of Chemical Sciences".

He was made docent in chemistry in 1794 and experimentator (laborator) in 1799, working as a demonstrator in the laboratory of   Torbern Bergman.  In 1798 he lectured on the theory of combustion.
In 1799, he was elected a member of the Royal Swedish Academy of Sciences.

Ekeberg had poor health throughout his life. During his childhood a severe cold had impaired his hearing, which was further weakened over the years, so that it hindered his teaching activities. Subsequently, a gas explosion blinded him in one eye.

Ekeberg was portrayed by his friends and students as a kind and gentle man. He died, unmarried, at the age of 46.

Research

Ekeberg analyzed a number of the minerals found at Ytterby and Falun. In 1802 he analyzed specimens of tantalite from Kimito, Finland, and of yttrotantalite from Ytterby, Sweden. He is credited with finding the element tantalum in both.

Ekeberg named the new element after the mythical Ancient Greek demigod Tantalus. According to legend, he was condemned to eternal frustration when he had to stand in water up to his neck, but the water receded as he attempted to drink.

The Anders Gustaf Ekeberg Tantalum Prize
In 2018 the Tantalum-Niobium International Study Center established The Anders Gustaf Ekeberg Tantalum Prize ("Ekeberg Prize"), an annual award to recognize excellence in tantalum research. The Prize will increase awareness of the many unique properties of tantalum products and the applications in which they excel. 
The inaugural winner of the Ekeberg Prize was Yuri Freeman, for his book "Tantalum and Niobium-Based Capacitors" (Springer, 2018).

References

External links
 

18th-century Swedish chemists
Uppsala University alumni
Academic staff of Uppsala University
1767 births
1813 deaths
Discoverers of chemical elements
Members of the Royal Swedish Academy of Sciences
19th-century Swedish chemists
Tantalum
Swedish deaf people
Rare earth scientists
Scientists with disabilities